Moe Yu San (born 11 July 1991) is a Burmese actress, fashion model, former beauty queen and sometimes a traditional dancer with the Burmese traditional dance troupe. She has her own songs produced in some albums with other artists.

Early life and education
Moe Yu San was born on 11 July 1991, in Yangon, Myanmar. She graduated from Yangon University with a degree in Myanmar major.

Career
In 2007, after she finished high school, she participated in Miss competitions such as Miss Now How, Miss Angel and Miss Moe Yan and had success. Because of that, she became an advertising model and actress.

In 2016, Moe subsequently retired from the entertainment industry when the time of her marriage and had a child, but she still participating as a traditional dancer in the traditional dance troupe Rose Anyeint which is held for charities. From 2007 to present, she has starred in over 100 video/films and appeared in many magazines cover.

Personal life
Moe Yu San married Swam Thu Moe in 2016. She gave birth to their only son on 21 August 2017.

Charity Work
Moe Yu San donated 300,000 Kyats each to Hnin Si Gone Peaceful Retreat Centre of Old Person and Film History Museum of Myanmar Film Association. Moe Yu San also participated in actor Pyay Ti Oo's "Pyay Ti Oo Foundation Fund Raising Concert" for students on 4 December 2011. She donated her artist fees for the foundation. She held a fan meeting with 'We love Moe Yu' members and donated blood. She joined in the group 'Rose' and participated in many charity events.

Filmography

Awards
 Miss Favourite (2007)
 Miss Shwe Mingalar Sone Twe (2008)
 Miss Angel or Demon (2007)
 Miss Now How (2007)
 Miss Now How Popular (2007)
 Miss Moe Yan (2007)

References

1991 births
Living people
Burmese film actresses
Burmese female models
People from Yangon
21st-century Burmese actresses